Idun is an alternate spelling of Iðunn, a goddess in Norse mythology. 

It may also refer to:

Places
 alternate spelling of Aydoun, a Jordanian city
 Idun Peak, Antarctica
 Idun Township, Aitkin County, Minnesota

People
 Idun Reiten (born 1942), Norwegian mathematics professor
 Connor Idun (born 2000), Australian rules footballer
 James Idun (born 1963), Ghanaian sprinter

Other uses
 Idun Industri, a Norwegian company
 Livsforsikringsselskapet Idun, a Norwegian company
 Idun (magazine), a Swedish magazine
 Viking Idun, a Viking Cruises ship
 Idun (horse), American racehorse
 Idun language of Nigeria